Bedurulanka 2012 is an upcoming Indian Telugu-language Dramedy film directed by Clax. It is bankrolled by Ravindra Benerjee Muppaneni under Loukya Entertainments. It stars Kartikeya Gummakonda, Neha Shetty, Ajay Ghosh, Srikanth Iyengar, L. B. Sriram in pivotal roles. 

The title and pre-look of the film was released on 28th Nov, 2022 followed by first look of the film on 30th Nov. The film has music composed by Mani Sharma.

Premise 
It's a dramedy set in 2012 in a fictional village called Bedurulanka.

Cast 

 Kartikeya Gummakonda
 Neha Shetty
 Ajay Ghosh
 Srikanth Iyengar
 Satya
 L. B. Sriram

Production

Development 
The title and pre-look of the film was released on 28th Nov, 2022. First look of the film was released on 30th Nov. Makers released the first look of Neha Shetty as Chitra on December 5th on occasion of her birthday.Kartikeya Gummakonda started dubbing for the film on 12th Dec, 2022.A glimpse of the film was released on 21st December. Shooting of the film was wrapped up on 23rd January, 2023.

Cast and crew 
Kartikeya Gummakonda and Neha Shetty play the lead roles and Ajay Ghosh, Srikanth Iyengar, L. B. Sriram are few among the supporting cast.

Music 
The music rights of the film is owned by Sony Music South. Mani Sharma composed the music and background score for the film.

References

External links 

 

Upcoming films
Upcoming Telugu-language films
Indian thriller drama films
Upcoming Indian films
Films scored by Mani Sharma
2023 thriller films